Tentasetae is a monotypic moth genus of the family Erebidae. Its only species, Tentasetae cambodiana, is only known from Cambodia, where it was described from Bokor National Park. Both the genus and the species were first described by Michael Fibiger in 2011.

The wingspan is about 12 mm. The forewings are beige, suffused with brown areas. There are six black dots on the costa and a dark brown medial area across the wing. The crosslines are beige and indistinct, except the terminal line which is marked with black interveinal dots. The fringes are brown. The hindwings are grey with an indistinct discal spot. The terminal line is brown and the fringes are grey. The underside is unicolorous brown. The forewing with costal dots like on the upper side and the hindwing is grey with a discal spot.

References

Micronoctuini
Monotypic moth genera
Moths of Asia